Bhanuben Manoharbhai Babariya is an Indian politician from Gujarat. She is a member of the Gujarat Legislative Assembly from the Rajkot Rural Assembly constituency since 2017. She is an incumbent cabinet minister in the Second Bhupendrabhai Patel Ministry.

Political career 
She is a member of BJP. She was given ticket in 2022 Gujarat Legislative Assembly election, she defeated AAP candidate Vashrambhai Sagathiya by margin of 48,494 votes.

Also currently she is a councilor from Ward no. 1 in Rajkot Municipal Corporation.

References

Living people
Year of birth missing (living people)
Bharatiya Janata Party politicians from Gujarat